Hendra Purnama (born January 12, 1997) is an Indonesian competitive archer. He competed as a member of the Indonesian archery squad in major international tournaments, spanning the World Championships, Asian Championships, 2014 Summer Youth Olympics, and the 2016 Summer Olympics.

Purnama was selected to compete for Indonesia at the 2016 Summer Olympics in Rio de Janeiro, shooting in both individual and team recurve tournaments. First, Purnama amassed a total of 655 points out of a maximum 720 to hand him a thirty-ninth seed heading to the knockout stage, along with his team's score of 1,962 collected from the classification round. Sitting at tenth in the men's team recurve, Purnama and his compatriots Riau Ega Agatha and Muhammad Wijaya put up a more tremendous effort by trouncing Chinese Taipei in the opening round, before they faced their quarterfinal match against the Americans, which led to the trio's early departure from the competition at 2–6. In the men's individual recurve, Purnama succumbed to the two-time medalist Viktor Ruban of Ukraine in the opening round match with a score of 3–7.

Individual performance timeline

References

External links
 

Indonesian male archers
Living people
People from Bantul Regency
1997 births
Archers at the 2014 Summer Youth Olympics
Olympic archers of Indonesia
Archers at the 2016 Summer Olympics
Sportspeople from Special Region of Yogyakarta
Competitors at the 2015 Southeast Asian Games
Competitors at the 2019 Southeast Asian Games
Southeast Asian Games gold medalists for Indonesia
Southeast Asian Games bronze medalists for Indonesia
Southeast Asian Games medalists in archery
21st-century Indonesian people

 Article in Indonesian